James Pierre Jr. (born September 16, 1996) is an American football cornerback for the Pittsburgh Steelers of the National Football League (NFL). He played college football at Florida Atlantic.

Early life and high school
Pierre attended Deerfield Beach High School. As a senior, he registered 48 tackles, four interceptions and two pass break-ups, helping Deerfield Beach to a 10-2 record. The Miami Herald named him one of the Top 25 seniors in Broward County, while the Sun-Sentinel named him all-county honorable mention. Pierre was considered a three-star prospect and the No. 48 safety in the Class of 2016 by 247Sports.com's composite rankings. He initially committed to Miami (FL) over offers from Louisville, Mississippi State, Tennessee, South Carolina and Wisconsin, but switched his commitment to North Carolina in February 2016. Pierre was denied admission and committed to Syracuse.

College career
Pierre was ruled academically ineligible by the NCAA for his freshman season. He transferred to Florida Atlantic and had 21 tackles and two pass deflections as a freshman in 2017. Pierre posted 55 tackles and nine pass breakups as a sophomore. On November 2, 2019, he made two interceptions in a 35-24 win over Western Kentucky. As a junior in 2019, Pierre recorded 44 tackles, 4.5 tackles for losses and three interceptions. He finished his collegiate career with 120 total tackles, 18 pass breakups, 8 1/2 tackles for losses and three interceptions in 39 games. Following the season, Pierre declared for the NFL draft, becoming  the fourth Florida Atlantic player to voluntarily leave school early to declare for the draft.

Professional career

After going undrafted in the 2020 NFL draft, Pierre signed an undrafted free agent deal with the Pittsburgh Steelers. He was named to the Steelers' initial 53-man roster, the only undrafted free agent to make the team in that fashion in 2020. On September 19, 2021, Pierre made his first career NFL start, filling in due to a groin injury to Joe Haden. On October 10, 2021, in a game against the Denver Broncos, Pierre made his first NFL interception on a 4th down pass from Teddy Bridgewater with 11 seconds on the game clock, sealing a 27-19 win for the Steelers.

References

External links
Florida Atlantic Owls bio

1996 births
Living people
Players of American football from Florida
Sportspeople from Broward County, Florida
American football cornerbacks
Florida Atlantic Owls football players
People from Deerfield Beach, Florida
Pittsburgh Steelers players